Dwyran was a rural district in the administrative county of Anglesey, Wales from 1894 to 1933.

The rural district was formed by the Local Government Act 1894 from the part of Carnarvon Rural Sanitary District in Anglesey. It took its name from the village of Dwyran, which lay at its centre.

The district consisted of five civil parishes:
Llanfair Cwmmwd
Llangaffo
Llangeinwen
Llanidan
Newborough

The rural district was abolished in 1933, when a county review order amalgamated it into an enlarged Aethwy Rural District.

External links

Aethwy Rural District Council and Dwyran Rural District Council records (Archives Network Wales), accessed January 23, 2008

Rural districts of Wales
History of Anglesey
1894 establishments in Wales